La Brigade des maléfices is a French TV series created by Claude Guillemot and Claude-Jean Philippe. It followed a fictional division of the National Police tasked with the investigation of supernatural cases. It was broadcast from August to September 1971 on ORTF.

Cast and characters 
 Léo Campion : Inspector Guillaume Martin Paumier
 Marc Lamole : Albert
 Jacques François : Chief Commissioner
 Jean-Claude Balard : Commissioner Muselier
 Pierre Brasseur : Diablevert / Diablegris
 Anny Duperey : Vénusine

External links
 

1971 French television series debuts
1971 French television series endings
French drama television series